Solodcha is a rural locality (a selo) and the administrative center of Solodchinskoye Rural Settlement, Olkhovsky District, Volgograd Oblast, Russia. The population was 1,572 as of 2010. There are 10 streets.

Geography 
Solodcha is located in steppe, on the Volga Upland, on the right bank of the Ilovlya River, 35 km southwest of Olkhovka (the district's administrative centre) by road. Stefanidovka is the nearest rural locality.

References 

Rural localities in Olkhovsky District
Tsaritsynsky Uyezd